Catherine of Brandenburg (Königsberg, 28 May 1602 – 27 August 1649, Schöningen) was an elected Princess of Transylvania between 1629 and 1630. She was the daughter of John Sigismund, Elector of Brandenburg, and Anna of Prussia

Life
Catherine was raised in Brandenburg, but lived with her mother in Sweden for several years after the marriage of her sister Maria Eleonora to king Gustavus Adolphus of Sweden in 1620. She was educated to become an ideal consort of a ruler and was "richly decorated with virtues suitable to a princely woman".

Princess consort of Transylvania
On 2 March 1626, she married Gabriel Bethlen, prince of Transylvania. The marriage allied the Protestant Prince of Transylvania with the Protestant powers of Denmark, Sweden and the Palatinate. A proxy marriage was celebrated in Berlin, and a second marriage in person performed in Kosice in Transylvania (now in Slovakia) after the arrival of Catherine. The couple settled in Alba Iulia in Transylvania.

The marriage is not described as happy. Gabriel Bethlen had numerous mistresses, and Catherine had lovers as well, most notably Istvan Csaky - because of the double standards of the time, however, only Catherine was given a bad reputation because of this.  

The marriage remained childless.  It was a condition in the marriage contract that Catherine should be elected the successor of her spouse, and she was elected as his successor by Transylvania's Diet and swore her solemn oath as his successor on May-June 1626, after which her status was confirmed by the Ottoman Porte through the effort of the Dutch and English allies of Bethlen.   Bethlen confirmed her election in his political will, in which he noted "perhaps no other illustrious princely woman has ever been elected."

Prince Gabriel Bethlen died on 25 November 1629.

Princess Regnant of Transylvania
Her policy was to bring Transylvania back under the influence of Holy Roman Emperor Ferdinand II. She tried in vain for a year to hold on to the throne, supporting herself on her favorite Istvan Csaky, but she was forced to abandon power on 21 September 1630.

The Sublime Porte, first chose her brother-in-law Stephen Bethlen as successor, but finally  George I Rákóczi succeeded her. The new prince was elected on 1 December 1630.

Later life
Catherine of Hohenzollern moved back to Germany where she converted to Catholicism in 1633 and married Francis Charles of Saxe-Lauenburg in 1639. She died on 27 August 1649.

References

1604 births
1649 deaths
Catherine
Bethlen family
Monarchs of Transylvania
17th-century women rulers
17th-century German people
17th-century Hungarian people
17th-century Romanian people
Catherine
Catherine
Hungarian nobility
Daughters of monarchs